For this  professional tennis tournament, Mariano Hood and Alberto Martín were the defending champions, but they didn't try to defend their title. Marco Crugnola and Alessandro Motti won this tournament, by defeating Treat Conrad Huey and Harsh Mankad 7–6(3), 6–3 in the final.

Seeds

Draw

Draw

References
 Doubles Draw

Citta di Como Challenger - Doubles
Città di Como Challenger